Wealthsimple Inc. is a Canadian online investment management service. The firm was founded in September 2014 by Michael Katchen, Brett Huneycutt and Rudy Adler and is based in Toronto. As of November 2021, the firm holds over C$15 billion in assets under management. It is primarily owned by Power Corporation indirectly at 42.5% through investments made through their holdings in Power Financial, IGM Financial and Portag3.

History

Pre-founding
Prior to founding Wealthsimple, Michael Katchen worked for 1000Memories, a Silicon Valley-based startup. After Ancestry.com bought 1000Memories in 2012, Katchen developed a spreadsheet with tips to help his colleagues set up investment portfolios. Interest in the spreadsheet helped inspire the idea for Wealthsimple. In 2014, he returned to Toronto to launch the company.

2015 acquisition of Canadian ShareOwner Investments Inc.
In December 2015, Wealthsimple merged with Canadian ShareOwner Investments Inc., a Canadian order-execution only broker-dealer. Through the acquisition, Wealthsimple became an owner of one of Canada's 14 discount brokerages (2015) alongside other owners of discount brokerages including Bank of Montreal and Royal Bank of Canada.

2016–present: focus on product offerings
In 2015, Product Hunt Toronto honored Wealthsimple with its first-ever Product of the Year Award. In 2016, the 20th Annual Webby Awards named Wealthsimple its Best Financial Services/Banking website.

In March 2016, Wealthsimple began offering clients access to socially responsible investment funds.

In May 2016, the firm announced a partnership with Mint, thus allowing clients to sync their Wealthsimple investment account to Mint's budgeting software. Also, that month, Wealthsimple launched Wealthsimple for Advisors, an automated platform for financial advisors. The service is intended for advisors who wish to maintain clients with accounts below their minimum requirements.

On 5 April 2018, the firm launched Wealthsimple Save, a high-interest savings account with a rate that will always be higher than traditional banks. Wealthsimple Trade, a zero-commission stock and exchange-traded fund (ETF) trading mobile app, was available as a beta in August 2018 and publicly launched in March 2019.

As of March 2019, Wealthsimple publicly supports Wealthica synchronization via their secure, open API.

In January 2020, Wealthsimple launched Wealthsimple Cash for Canadian customers, a hybrid savings/chequing account offering high interest on balances. Spending features such as a Visa Debit card, e-transfers, bill payments, and paycheque/cheque deposits are planned to be rolled out through 2020.

As of March 2020, Wealthsimple Trade became unable to handle the volume of trades their customers were placing and began capping the number of users and putting some investors on to waitlists.

In November that year, Wealthsimple Cash transitioned from a savings account to a peer-to-peer cash transfer app. Having first launched in beta, the app was made widely available in March 2021.

On 8 July 2021, Wealthsimple Trade announced that they would launch fractional shares in the platform, starting the next day.

In October 2022, Wealthsimple announced that it had become Canada's first nonbank, non-credit-union to be approved for a direct settlement account by the Bank of Canada, paving the way for its access to Canada's future real-time-rail payment system.

Products and services

Invest
Wealthsimple Invest is the company's automated investing service, which manages users' investments via a personalized portfolio of low-fee exchange-traded funds.

Via Wealthsimple for Advisors and also for firms via Wealthsimple for Work, Wealthsimple combines a robo-advisor platform with access to live advisors. Each client is provided an investment advisor who helps match investments to the client's long-term goals and risk tolerance. The company does not occupy retail space; instead its advisors are available via phone, text message, email or video chat. There is no account minimum required and no charge per transaction. An annual fee is charged ranging from 0.4% to 0.5% based on account size. Portfolios are monitored daily and automatically rebalanced if they move beyond certain thresholds.

In September 2018, the company started offering a micro-investing service called Roundup, which automatically rounds up purchases and invests the extra change into one's Wealthsimple investment account.

Cash 
Wealthsimple Cash is a peer-to-peer cash transfer platform.

In April 2018, the company began offering Smart Savings (later known as Wealthsimple Save), a savings account with a 1.7% interest rate. Their site now promotes the rate at 1.0%.

In January 2020, the company launched Wealthsimple Cash for Canadian customers, a hybrid savings/chequing account offering high interest on balances. That November, Wealthsimple Cash transitioned from a savings account to a peer-to-peer cash transfer app. Having first launched in beta, the app was made widely available in March 2021.

On 29 March 2021, Wealthsimple simplified the names of their products and how users see their accounts. Since the update, users are only able to have one Wealthsimple Cash account, and any accounts that are not connected to the Wealthsimple Cash app now appear as Wealthsimple Save.

Trade and Crypto 
Wealthsimple Trade is a self-directed investment platform, allowing users to buy and sell various individual stocks and exchange-traded funds (ETFs) on major Canadian and U.S. exchanges. This platform was introduced in March 2019, offering a stock and ETF trading account with zero-commission fees in the U.S. and Canada. Wealthsimple Trade was the first commission-free trading platform in Canada.

Wealthsimple Crypto is the company's platform for buying and selling several cryptocurrencies, including BTC and ETH. This service is offered through the same app/web portal as Trade. Much like Trade, this service has no fees. WealthSimple Crypto now allows users to deposit and withdraw select cryptocurrencies to and from self-custody wallets.

Tax
Wealthsimple Tax (formerly SimpleTax) is an all-in-one tax preparation and filing platform.

In September 2019, Wealthsimple acquired SimpleTax, a Canadian tax software company originally launched in 2012. The acquisition of SimpleTax added online tax-return preparation and filing service to Wealthsimple's suite of financial products.

Current operations

Clients

Finances
Funding
In May 2014, the company initially raised million from investors Eric Kirzner, Joe Canavan, and Roger Martin.

In April 2015, the firm received $10million from Power Financial Corporation in an agreement structured to allow for a future investment of $20million within 12 months. In total, Power Financial Corporation has invested $30million in Series A funding. It is now primarily owned by Power Corporation indirectly at 77.4% (the investments were through their holdings in Power Financial, IGM Financial, and Portag3).

In October 2020, Wealthsimple raised $114million (US$87million) in funding from an investor group led by Technology Crossover Ventures, in addition to Greylock Partners, Meritech Capital Partners, Two Sigma Ventures, and Allianz X.

Assets under management

References

External links
 

Robo-advisors
Financial services companies established in 2014
Online services
Online brokerages
Investment companies of Canada
Financial services companies of Canada
Companies based in Toronto
Financial technology
Neobanks